William H. "Speed" Gardner July 2, 1895 in East Liberty, PennsylvaniaApril 25, 1972 in Bayonet Point, Florida) was an American racecar driver during the AAA era. His best result was the first Indy 500 race he managed to qualify for, finishing sixth in 1929 with the help of his relief driver Chet Gardner, completing the event at an average speed of 88.4 mph in his Miller powered Chromolite car. After two successive mechanical failures in 1930 and 1931, he looked ready to qualify for the 1932 Indy 500, but failed to do so. While attempting to qualify for the 1933 race he crashed and sustained a fracture to his left thigh along with severe bruises.

Indy 500 results

References

External links
 

Indianapolis 500 drivers
1895 births
1972 deaths
Sportspeople from Pittsburgh
Racing drivers from Pennsylvania
Racing drivers from Pittsburgh